Stranger in a Strange Land is a 1961 science fiction novel by Robert A. Heinlein.

Stranger in a Strange Land may also refer to:

Bible
Book of Exodus 2:22 (King James Version only), "And she bare [him] a son, and he called his name Gershom: for he said, I have been a stranger in a strange land"

Songs
"Stranger in a Strange Land" (Barbra Streisand song), 2005
"Stranger in a Strange Land" (Iron Maiden song), 1986
"Stranger in a Strange Land", by 30 Seconds to Mars from This Is War, 2009
"Stranger in a Strange Land", by Ace Frehley from Frehley's Comet, 1987
"Stranger in a Strange Land", by Blackburn & Snow, recorded 1966, from Something Good for Your Head, 1999
"Stranger in a Strange Land", by the Byrds from Turn! Turn! Turn!, 1996 re-issue
"Stranger in a Strange Land", by Eddie Money from Can't Hold Back, 1986
"Stranger in a Strange Land", by Leon Russell from Leon Russell and the Shelter People, 1971
"Stranger in a Strange Land", by Spock's Beard from Snow, 2002
"Stranger in a Strange Land", by Triumph from Thunder Seven, 1984
"Stranger in a Strange Land", by U2 from October, 1981

Television
"Stranger in a Strange Land" (Lost), a 2007 episode of the television series Lost
"Chapter 1: Stranger in a Strange Land", the series premiere of the television series The Book of Boba Fett
“Stranger in a Strange Land” final episode of season 3 of For All Mankind